Koffi Gueli (born 31 December 1993) is a Togolese professional footballer who plays as a striker for Gbohloé-su of the Togolese Championnat National and the Togo national team.

Club career
After having started his career at AS Police in Lomé, Gueli moved on to play for two other first division clubs in Togo, namely AS Togo-Port and Dynamic Togolais. In 2014, he made a move to ASFA Yennenga in Burkina Faso before moving to Deportivo Mongomo in Equatorial Guinea. At Mongomo, he scored 15 goals in all competitions and won the Equatoguinean Cup with them in their 2015 season.

In October 2016, he joined AS Denguélé in Ligue 1 in Ivory Coast. He then made a return to Togo in 2019, signing for Gbohloé-su for the second half of the season, scoring 7 goals in the Togolese Championnat.

International career
He has represented Togo national youth teams, notably the Togo U20 team.

He was called up to the preliminary Togo national team squad for the 2017 African Cup of Nations by Claude Le Roy but did not make the final 23 man squad for the competition.

In July 2019, he played for Togo in their 2020 African Nations Championship qualifier against Benin.

Honours
Deportivo Mongomo
 Equatoguinean Cup: 2015

Career statistics

Club

International

References

1993 births
Living people
Association football forwards
Togolese footballers
Togo international footballers
AS Stade Mandji players
21st-century Togolese people
Togo A' international footballers
2020 African Nations Championship players
Togolese expatriate sportspeople in Burkina Faso
Togolese expatriate sportspeople in Equatorial Guinea
Togolese expatriate sportspeople in Ivory Coast
Expatriate footballers in Burkina Faso
Expatriate footballers in Ivory Coast
Expatriate footballers in Equatorial Guinea
Togolese expatriate footballers
Deportivo Mongomo players
ASFA Yennenga players
AS Denguélé players
AS Togo-Port players
Dynamic Togolais players
Togolese expatriate sportspeople in Rwanda
Togolese expatriate sportspeople in Gabon
Expatriate footballers in Rwanda
Expatriate footballers in Gabon
Rayon Sports F.C. players